Peter Dyke (born 11 March 1965) is an English organist.  A Fellow of the Royal College of Organists, he has recorded several albums either as a soloist or accompanist, including three for Regent Records and one for Priory Records.

Career 
Dyke was organ scholar of Robinson College, Cambridge and was awarded Fellowship of the Royal College of Organists in 1987.  He then became the organist of St Helen's Church, Wheathampstead.  Dyke remained at St Helen's until 1992, at which point he moved to St Woolos' Cathedral, Newport, serving there as assistant organist.  While at Newport, Dyke entered the interpretation competition at the 1993 St Albans International Organ Festival, co-winning second place.

From 1995 to 1998, Dyke held the organ scholarship at St Albans Cathedral, after which he moved to Hereford Cathedral.  He now serves at Hereford as its assistant director of music.  In addition to his regular duties there, Dyke accompanies the cathedral choir during its various broadcasts and tours, as well as at the annual Three Choirs Festival.  The cathedral's Voluntary Choir was founded by him in 2000.

Dyke produced a series of "audio diaries" that were broadcast by BBC Radio 3 in 2005.  Called Bach Walks, the series showed him following (by car) the 260-mile route J.S. Bach walked from Arnstadt to Lübeck to meet Dietrich Buxtehude.

Dyke's carol Three Kings was published by Encore in 2014.

Discography 

Dyke provides accompaniment for three of the 20 tracks on the 1997 Lammas recording.

References

External links
Listing of recordings registered at the British Library
 BBC webpage for Bach Walks
 

English organists
British male organists
Alumni of Robinson College, Cambridge
1965 births
Living people
21st-century organists
21st-century British male musicians